The 1976 Campeon de Campeones was the 34th edition of this Mexican Super Cup football match played by:

 League winners: América
 Copa México: UANL

Was played on August 15, 1976, at México DF, in a single match, to extra time.

Match details

References
Mexico - Statistics of season 1975/1976. (RSSSF)
Mexico - Statistics of Mexican Supercup. (RSSSF)

Cam
Campeón de Campeones
August 1976 sports events in Mexico